These quarterbacks have started at least one game for the Seattle Seahawks of the National Football League. They are listed in order of the date of each player's first start at quarterback for the Seahawks.

Starting quarterbacks

The number of games they started during the season is listed to the right:

Regular season

Postseason

Most games as starting quarterback
These quarterbacks have the most starts for the Seahawks in regular season games (through the 2021 season).

Team career passing records

(Through the 2021 season)

See also

 List of NFL starting quarterbacks

References and footnotes

Seattle Seahawks

quarterbacks